House of Rock is a satirical animation that aired on the UK's Channel 4 from 2000 to 2002. It revolved around the afterlives of some of the world's most famous dead rock stars, including Freddie Mercury, John Denver, The Notorious B.I.G., Kurt Cobain and Marc Bolan. Bolan was replaced in the second series by John Lennon. Forced to share a house in limbo, they try to cope with isolation, clashing personalities and relentless boredom.

The show aired as part of Channel 4's late-night 4 Music. Often, segments of the episode would appear as links between videos, reminiscent of Beavis and Butthead. On average, each episode from the first series was 5 minutes long, while each episode from the second series was 10 minutes long.

The characters occupy a huge rundown house in a bleak, depressing landscape with nothing around seemingly for miles. Much of the comedy comes from each character's frustrations with their surroundings, associates and inability to do anything further now they're dead.

Characters

Freddie Mercury
Extremely theatrical and flamboyant, Freddie is highly strung and quick to anger. He openly despises all of his housemates, especially the Notorious B.I.G. He keeps a cat called Galileo.

John Denver
The group's only optimist, John is sweet and naïve, convinced there is some hope of emerging from limbo. As such he is constantly abused and berated by other more cynical housemates. His love of peace has led him to severely suppress his anger. John can often be heard using phrases used in Scooby-Doo, such as "jinkies!"

Kurt Cobain
Paranoid and depressed, Kurt is so tired of life he owns a pad of pre-printed suicide notes that he can stick anywhere like Post-it notes. Nevertheless, he is quite friendly, especially with Biggie and John. Kurt's dream is to be series champion on the UK gameshow Fifteen to One.

The Notorious B.I.G.
Known as "Biggie" within the house, Notorious is especially depressed with limbo, since he has had to leave all the trappings of his hip-hop lifestyle behind. Sometimes his sexual frustration is so great he has to take it out on the house's postman, a constantly shuddering Sid Vicious. He cannot stand Freddie Mercury, and would have shot him long ago if his gun was capable of doing anything.

Marc Bolan
The house's resident hippie, elfin Marc is only capable of talking in twee rhyming couplets in the style of his lyrics. Frustrated with his hippie sensibilities and feyness, when Satan Davina McCall demands one of their number join her in hell Big Brother style, the group agree on Marc. They are then horrified to discover his replacement is the peace-and-love obsessed John Lennon.

John Lennon
John, pompous and pretentious, with a droning Scouse voice. He comes with his own Yellow Submarine, which he wears around his waist at all times.

Cast
Richard Preddy - (voices - Marc Bolan & others)
Gary Howe - (voices - John Denver, John Lennon & others)
Gavin Claxton - (voices - Freddie Mercury, Kurt Cobain & others)
Cavin Cornwall - (voices - The Notorious B.I.G.)
Morwenna Banks (voices)

Crew
Richard Preddy - Writer 
Gary Howe - Writer 
Gavin Claxton - Writer 
Stuart Evans - Animation Director 
Gavin Claxton - Producer

External links
 

2000s British adult animated television series
2000s British animated comedy television series
2000s British black comedy television series
2000s British music television series
2000s British satirical television series
2000 British television series debuts
2002 British television series endings
British adult animated comedy television series
Channel 4 comedy
Television shows about death
Animation based on real people
Cultural depictions of American men
Cultural depictions of British men
Cultural depictions of John Lennon
Cultural depictions of Freddie Mercury
Cultural depictions of Kurt Cobain
Cultural depictions of pop musicians
Cultural depictions of rock musicians
Cultural depictions of hip hop musicians
Limbo
Fiction about the afterlife